Sindora supa is a species of plant in the family Fabaceae. It is endemic to the Philippines. It is threatened by habitat loss.

References

supa
Vulnerable plants
Trees of the Philippines
Endemic flora of the Philippines
Taxonomy articles created by Polbot
Taxa named by Elmer Drew Merrill